The Water Education Foundation is a nonprofit organization whose goal is to provide unbiased, balanced information on water issues in California and the Southwestern United States.

The Foundation's mission, since its founding in 1977, has been "to create a better understanding of water resources and foster public understanding and resolution of water resource issues through facilitation, education and outreach."

Located in Sacramento, California, the Foundation offers publications, public television documentaries, briefings and conferences and school programs to help educate the public on a variety of water issues. The Foundation is led by an executive director, Jennifer Bowles, and is governed by a volunteer board of 33 members representing water, education, business, environmental and public interest communities in California. The board of directors meets quarterly.

Public television documentaries
In 2009 the Foundation won a regional Emmy award for the 2008 public television documentary, Salt of the Earth: Salinity in California’s Central Valley hosted by comedian Paul Rodriguez. This program discusses the growing problem of salt buildup in the Central Valley and discusses potential solutions. Two other documentaries, Fate of the Jewel (2001), which discusses Lake Tahoe pollution, and High Stakes at the Salton Sea (2002), which discusses efforts to restore the Salton Sea and is narrated by actor Val Kilmer, also received regional Emmy awards.

Publications, briefings and conferences
The flagship of the Foundation is Western Water,  a quarterly magazine through which readers learn about topics such as California water supply, water quality, the Colorado River, the Sacramento-San Joaquin Delta, groundwater, and endangered species. Western Water became an online news publication in 2018.

In 2000, the Foundation released a book, Water and the Shaping of California, written by then-Program Director Sue McClurg. With a foreword written by historian Kevin Starr, the book features historical photos of water while the text discusses the way water has influenced the development of the state's cities and farms. The book includes well-known quotations and excerpts from literature about water.

Each year the Foundation organizes conferences and briefings that focus on current water issues and include prominent speakers from the water community. Events in 2009 included a U.S.–Mexico Binational Drought Science conference with the California Department of Water Resources. Events in 2010 have included an International Groundwater Conference, organized with the University of California, Davis, with speakers from organizations including U.S. Geological Survey, International Water Management Institute and the California Farm Bureau.  In August 2010 the Foundation was one of several nonpartisan groups (including the California Center for the Book and the California State Library) that participated in 'Water Conversations' held in the Sacramento Delta area by the University of California Cooperative Extension Service.

Water tours
Each year the Foundation offers tours that allow participants to visit various water facilities, rivers and regions in California and the Southwest for educational purposes. Speakers representing water districts, agricultural and environmental interests discuss topics including water supply, water quality, environmental restoration, flood management, groundwater and water conservation. Tours include the Sacramento San-Joaquin Delta, the Lower Colorado River, California's Central Valley and the San Joaquin River.

Project WET
The Foundation is the California Coordinator for Project WET (Water Education for Teachers), an award-winning, nonprofit water education program and publisher. The program facilitates and promotes awareness, appreciation, knowledge, and stewardship of water resources through the dissemination of classroom-ready teaching aids and the establishment of internationally sponsored Project WET programs.

Aquafornia
In 2008, the Foundation began a partnership with Aquafornia, a web site that posts daily news updates on water issues. These updates are taken from a variety of sources including mainstream newspapers and magazines, other water blogs, press releases, trade journals and other non-traditional news sources.

Funding sources
The Foundation's general activities were supported by contributions, sales of public educational materials, tours and briefings. A variety of grants from government agencies, private foundations and other organizations fund some of the Foundation's special programs, publications and projects.

Projects
In 2009 the Foundation assisted the reading promotion agency California Center for the Book with developing resources to help public libraries host programming about water. The project is continuing through 2010 and is offered to all 181 library districts in the state.

The Foundation is the fiscal sponsor for a feature-length documentary film which examines the life of former California governor Edmund G. "Pat" Brown, titled "California State of Mind: The Legacy of Pat Brown." The film focuses in part on his quest to build the California Aqueduct and his fight against the death penalty.

References

Further reading

External links
 Water Education Foundation
 Aquafornia
 Project WET

Water organizations in the United States
Environmental organizations based in California